Wu Hanxiong (born January 21, 1981, in Shantou, Guangdong) is a male Chinese foil fencer who competed in the 2004 Summer Olympics.

In 2004 he won the silver medal with the Chinese foil team. In the individual Olympic foil tournament he was eliminated in the quarterfinals.

References

1981 births
Living people
Chinese male fencers
Fencers at the 2004 Summer Olympics
Olympic fencers of China
Olympic silver medalists for China
People from Shantou
Fencers from Guangdong
Medalists at the 2004 Summer Olympics
Asian Games medalists in fencing
Fencers at the 2002 Asian Games
Fencers at the 2006 Asian Games
Asian Games gold medalists for China
Asian Games bronze medalists for China
Medalists at the 2002 Asian Games
Medalists at the 2006 Asian Games
Universiade medalists in fencing
Universiade gold medalists for China
Olympic medalists in fencing
Medalists at the 2007 Summer Universiade